HEPA is a type of air filter.

HEPA may also refer to:

Liver Diseases 
 Hepatitis A, a disease of the liver
 Hepatitis B, a disease of the liver
 Hepatitis C, a disease of the liver
 Hepatitis D, a disease of the liver
 Hepatitis E, a disease of the liver

Other uses
 Health–enhancing physical activity; see Exercise